The 1st AIBA Asian 2004 Olympic Boxing Qualifying Tournament was held in Guangzhou, PR China from March 18 to March 23, 2004. It was the first chance for amateur boxers from Asia to qualify for the 2004 Summer Olympics after the 2004 Asian Amateur Boxing Championships in Puerto Princesa, Philippines from January 11 to 18, 2004. The top two boxers in each weight division gained a place in the Olympics, with the exception of the heavyweight and super heavyweight divisions in which just the winner was entered.

Medal winners

Qualified

Light Flyweight (– 48 kg)

Flyweight (– 51 kg)

Bantamweight (– 54 kg)

Featherweight (– 57 kg)

Lightweight (– 60 kg)

Light Welterweight (– 64 kg)

Welterweight (– 69 kg)

Middleweight (– 75 kg)

Light Heavyweight (– 81 kg)

Heavyweight (– 91 kg)

Super Heavyweight (+ 91 kg)

See also
2004 Asian Amateur Boxing Championships
2nd AIBA Asian 2004 Olympic Qualifying Tournament

References
amateur-boxing

Asian 1
2004 in Chinese sport